Chicumbo is a town in Gaza Province, Mozambique.

Nearby towns and villages include Mucombo (3.5 nm), Bande (2.9 nm), Valente (1.0 nm), Tchaila (4.3 nm), Manganhane (3.8 nm) and Bananhane (5.3 nm) .

References

Populated places in Gaza Province